Universidad José Antonio Páez is a private, coeducational university named after the Venezuelan war hero José Antonio Páez, located in the city of San Diego, Carabobo State, Venezuela. The university, also known as "UJAP", is one of the fastest growing campuses in the country with an enrollment of nearly 15,000 students.

Degrees 
Undergraduate degrees offered:

Industrial Engineering
Mechanical Engineering
Computer Engineering
Electronic Engineering
Telecommunications Engineering
Civil Engineering
Architecture
Education
Law
Political Science
Dentistry
Business & Administration
Accounting
Marketing
Industrial Relations
Public Administration
Public Accounting

Universities in Venezuela
Buildings and structures in Valencia, Venezuela
Educational institutions established in 1997
1997 establishments in Venezuela